The Millennium Star is a diamond owned by De Beers. At 203.04 carats (40.608 g), it is the world's second largest known top-color (grade D, i.e. colourless), internally and externally flawless, pear-shaped diamond.

The diamond was discovered in the Mbuji-Mayi district of Zaire in 1990 in alluvial deposits; uncut, it was 777 carats (155.4 g). It was purchased by De Beers during the height of the country's Civil War that took place in the early to mid-nineties. It took over three years for workers of the Steinmetz Diamond Group to produce the classic pear form. The cutting was done using lasers.

It was first displayed in October 1999 as the centerpiece of the De Beers Millennium diamond collection. The collection also includes eleven blue diamonds totalling 118 carats (23.6 g) and The Heart of Eternity. They were displayed at London's Millennium Dome over 2000. There was an attempt on 7 November 2000 to steal the collection (see Millennium Dome raid), but the Metropolitan Police discovered the plot and arrested the robbers before their escape. Crime journalist Kris Hollington wrote a book called Diamond Geezers about the attempted theft. The book also features a detailed history of the Millennium Star.

The largest cut white (D) diamond by weight is the 1991 modified heart-shaped  Centenary Diamond.

See also
 List of diamonds

References

 http://www.rivieratimes.com

External links

 Some images of the diamond

Individual diamonds
De Beers
2000 in London
Diamonds originating in Zaire